Love, Peace & Poetry – Vol.10 Chilean is the tenth volume in the Love, Peace & Poetry series released by QDK Media and Normal Records in 2008. This volume explores obscuro garage rock and psychedelic rock bands from Chile.

Track listing
 "Yellow Moon" (Kissing Spell) – 2:17
 "Foto de Primera Comunión" (Los Jaivas) – 6:30
 "Primavera de Miss L.O'B." (Los Vidrios Quebrados) – 2:33
 "Erótica" (Aguaturbia) – 3:49
 "Momentos" (Blops) – 2:54
 "Realidad" (Sacros) – 3:58
 "La Muerte de Mi Hermano" (Los Mac's) – 2:34
 "Pisándose La Cola" (Blops) – 6:44
 "Canto Sin Nombre" (Embrujo) – 4:37
 "Pobre Gato" (Los Beat 4) – 2:02
 "I Wonder Who" (Aguaturbia) – 2:56
 "Tu, Yo y Nuestro Amor" (Tumulto) – 4:18
 "Pirómano" (Blops) – 5:35
 "Magnetism" (Escombros – 2:45
 "Civilización" (Los Beat 4) – 2:17
 "Cuantos Que No Tienen y Merecen" (Congregacion) – 3:28
 "Así Serás" (El Congreso) – 3:40

Love, Peace & Poetry albums
Psychedelic rock albums by Chilean artists
2005 compilation albums